An iron bird is a ground-based test device used for prototyping and integrating aircraft systems during the development of new aircraft designs.  Aircraft systems are installed into the iron bird so their functions can be tested both individually and in correlation with other systems.

Overview 
Iron birds are used for system integration, reliability testing, and shakedown testing of aircraft systems such as landing gear, avionics, hydraulics, and flight controls.  The components may be arranged roughly in the same layout as they will be in the final aircraft design, but left accessible for ease of maintenance. Some iron birds also include a flight deck so that testing can include pilot inputs and simulated flight profiles, and can be used in pre-flight pilot training. Others are used for testing of propulsion systems. 

Iron birds can also be used after aircraft certification for troubleshooting ongoing issues and for testing of proposed modifications prior to fleet integration.

See also 

 Engine test stand
 Testbed aircraft

References 

Aerospace technologies
Aircraft industry